The Pterochrozinae are a subfamily of the Tettigoniidae found in Central and South America. They were previously placed as a tribe in the subfamily Pseudophyllinae and have been called "leaf-mimic katydids".

Genera 
, Orthoptera Species File lists the following:
Anommatoptera Vignon, 1923
Asbolomma Beier, 1962
Celidophylla Saussure & Pictet, 1898
Cycloptera Serville, 1838
Mimetica Pictet, 1888
Ommatoptera Pictet, 1888
Paracycloptera Vignon, 1926
Porphyromma Redtenbacher, 1895
Pterochroza Serville, 1831
Rhodopteryx Pictet, 1888
Roxelana Kirby, 1906
Tanusia Stål, 1874
Tanusiella Enderlein, 1917
Typophyllum Serville, 1838

References

External links

 
Orthoptera subfamilies
Orthoptera of South America